Eristalis is a large genus of hoverflies, family Syrphidae, in the order Diptera. Several species are known as drone flies (or droneflies) because they bear a resemblance to honeybee drones.

Drone flies and their relatives are fairly common generalist pollinators, the larvae of which are aquatic, and breathe through a long, snorkel-like appendage, hence the common name rat-tailed maggots.

Eristalis is a large genus of around 99 species, and is subdivided into several subgenera and species groups (Eristalomyia, Eristalis, Eoseristalis etc.).

Scientific name and grammatical gender
The scientific name was proposed by Pierre André Latreille in 1804. He placed seven species in his new genus, but listed the names as combinations with Syrphus, so it remained unclear what gender he attributed to the name (the gender of the name Syrphus is masculine). In the two centuries following its publication, Eristalis was sometimes considered to be of feminine gender, sometimes to be of masculine gender. George Henry Verrall (1901) assigned its gender as masculine, a choice followed in British literature, and also in Dutch, Polish, Czech, Spanish and Portuguese literature. In several other European languages and in North America, the tradition was to consider it as a feminine word. In 1993 the International Commission on Zoological Nomenclature placed the name on the Official List, and gave its gender as masculine, without justification for that choice. In 2004, Peter Chandler, Andrew Wakeham-Dawson and Angus McCullough submitted an application to confirm the gender of Eristalis as feminine. They referred to ICZN Art. 30.1.1, which states that a name in Latin form takes the gender given for that word in standard Latin dictionaries. In Composition of Scientific Words by R.W. Brown (1954), "eristalis" is listed as a feminine word that refers to an unknown precious stone. The request of Chandler et al. was granted less than two years after submission. As of 2006, Eristalis is officially a word of feminine gender.

Identification
For terms see Morphology of Diptera.
As a true fly, Diptera, the species of the genus Eristalis has a single pair of wings and a pair of halteres and as a member of the family syrphidae  the presence of a spurious vein in the wing is key. Defined by  Latreille in 1804  Eristlis was restricted by Meigen 1882 to those species with a sinuate vein R4+5 and petiolate cell r1. 
Since the origin of the genus Eristalis many genera have been added that refine the description of Latreille such as Eristalinus, Meromarcrus, Palpada Helopilus etc. the subtribe Eristalinus has been established to contain these genera. now is generally accepted as which have vein R2+3
sinuate, cell r1 usually petiolate and metafemur with basolateral setose patch. with the addition of the following criteria: Anepimeron with triangular portion bare, Katepimeron pilose Meron bare posteroventrally, without pile anterior or ventral to metathoracic spiracle, eye pilose.

Larvae
The larvae of Eristalini are aquatic and of the long-tailed type. Those of Eristalis very commonly found breeding in putrid or stagnant water or in moist excrement, and are called “rat-tailed maggots” or “mousies.” 

The  "tail" is actually an extendable breathing tube often used to extend above the waterline. This tube allows the larvae to live in oxygen depleted water such as sewage and stagnant pools where most other larvae can not exist. Rat tailed larvae also exploit wet mud, manure and moist rotting vegetation. Many species of Eristalis remain unknown. Working in the area where larvae are likely to be found like manure pit, sewage seepage and stagnant pools is difficult and then rearing the larvae to adults is even more so. Basic information on many species of Eristalis is remains to be discovered.

Species

Gallery

References

Eristalinae
Hoverfly genera
Taxa named by Pierre André Latreille